Fabián Raúl Benítez Gómez (born 2 July 1981) is a Paraguayan naturalized Chilean footballer that currently plays for Primera División club C.D. Universidad de Concepción as defensive midfielder.

External links
 Benítez at Football-Lineups
 
 

1984 births
Living people
Paraguayan footballers
Paraguayan expatriate footballers
Universidad de Concepción footballers
Audax Italiano footballers
Cobreloa footballers
Colo-Colo footballers
San Luis de Quillota footballers
Primera B de Chile players
Chilean Primera División players
Expatriate footballers in Chile
Paraguayan expatriate sportspeople in Chile
Paraguayan emigrants to Chile
Association football midfielders
Naturalized citizens of Chile